Infurcitinea amseli is a moth of the family Tineidae. It is found in Jordan, Turkmenistan, Pakistan, Afghanistan and Iran.

References

Moths described in 1957
Meessiinae